The Croatia national under-19 football team represents Croatia in international football at this age level and is controlled by the Croatian Football Federation, the governing body for football in Croatia.

Competition history
Prior to 1990 Croatian players played for the Yugoslavia Under-18 team. Although the Croatian team was formed in the early 1990s after the breakup of Yugoslavia, the Under-18 team had to wait for UEFA to officially accept Croatian Football Federation's membership bid in order to be included in UEFA-governed competitions. Croatia's membership was accepted in June 1993 and the first continental competition Croatia under-18 team took part in was the qualification for 1994 European Under-18 Championship. In 2001 UEFA changed the player eligibility dates and from 2002 onwards the continental championship is known as UEFA European Under-19 Championship. The tournament is held every year and serves as the qualifying tournament for FIFA U-20 World Cup which is held every two years.

Croatia Under-18/19 team managed to qualify for European championship on four occasions. In 1998 and 2010 they won third place which earned them a place at the 1999 FIFA World Youth Championship and 2011 FIFA U-20 World Cup.

UEFA U-18/19 European Championship record

Current squad
 The following players were called up for the 2023 UEFA European Under-19 Championship qualification matches.
 Match dates: 16, 19 and 22 November 2022
 Opposition: ,  and Caps and goals correct as of:''' 25 September 2022, after the match against .

Past squads
 2010 UEFA U-19 European Championship squad
 2012 UEFA U-19 European Championship squad
 2016 UEFA U-19 European Championship squad

See also 

 Croatia men's national football team
 Croatia men's national football B team
 Croatia men's national under-23 football team
 Croatia men's national under-21 football team
 Croatia men's national under-20 football team
 Croatia men's national under-18 football team
 Croatia men's national under-17 football team
 Croatia men's national under-16 football team
 Croatia men's national under-15 football team
 Croatia women's national football team
 Croatia women's national under-19 football team
 Croatia women's national under-17 football team

References

External links
 European Under-19 Championship official website at UEFA.com
 Youth team news at the Croatian FA official website 
 Appearance stats for all youth selections at the Croatian FA official website 

Under-19
European national under-19 association football teams
Youth football in Croatia